Taça do Atlântico was a national football team's competition held between 1956 and 1976 on an irregular basis, contested by the national football teams from South America. 

Teams participating were Argentina, Brazil, Paraguay and Uruguay national sides. Paraguay did not play in the first edition of the competition. There were 3 championships and the Brazil won them all. In 1956, a club competition was played in parallel to the main competition, but the final between Boca Juniors and Corinthians was never played.

1956 Taça do Atlântico

1960 Taça do Atlântico

1976 Taça do Atlântico

Note:
 Matches between Argentina and Paraguay also counted for the 1976 Copa Félix Bogado
 Matches between Argentina and Brazil also counted for the 1976 Roca Cup  
 First match between Argentina and Uruguay also counted for the 1976 Copa Lipton  
 Second match between Argentina and Uruguay also counted for the 1976 Copa Newton
 Matches between Brazil and Uruguay also counted for the 1976 Copa Río Branco
 Matches between Brazil and Paraguay also counted for the 1976 Taça Oswaldo Cruz

All-time scorers

Hat-tricks
Since the first official tournament in 1956, 2 hat-tricks have been scored in over 20 matches of the 3 editions of the tournament. The first hat-trick was scored by José Sanfilippo of Argentina, during a Clásico del Río de la Plata against Uruguay on 17 August 1960; and the last was by Héctor Scotta, who netted a hat-trick for Argentina, but this time against Paraguay in a 3-2 win on 25 February 1976.

References

Argentina national football team
Brazil national football team
Paraguay national football team
Uruguay national football team
International association football competitions hosted by Argentina
International association football competitions hosted by Brazil
International association football competitions hosted by Paraguay
International association football competitions hosted by Uruguay
Defunct international association football competitions in South America
1956 in South American football
1960 in South American football
1976 in South American football